This is a list of members of the South Australian Legislative Council between 2022 and 2026. As half of the Legislative Council's terms expired at each state election, half of these members were elected at the 2018 state election with terms expiring in 2026, while the other half were elected at the 2022 state election with terms expiring in 2030.

See also
 Members of the South Australian House of Assembly, 2022–2026

Members of South Australian parliaments by term
21st-century Australian politicians